The Charles H. Stockton Chair of International Law at the United States Naval War College has its origins in the Naval War College's oldest civilian academic post.  The first civilian academic at the College, James R. Soley was appointed in 1885 to lecture on international law.  Dr. Freeman Snow of Harvard University gave lectures on the subject in 1894, his death in the midst of the academic program led to the appointment then Commander Charles Stockton to complete his lectures and to publish them for the use of the Navy.  Stockton prepared a new edition in 1898, teaching classes in the subject.  In 1901, Professoe John Bassett Moore lectured on international law and recommended that the college appoint Harvard University Law professor George Grafton Wilson as the visiting professor.  Wilson lectured annually from 1901 to 1937.   From 1946 to 1953, Professor Manley Hudson of Harvard regularly came from Cambridge to give the College's International Law lectures.

On 11 July 1951, the Chief of Naval Personnel approved the formal establishment of a full-time  professorship to replace the part-time position.  On 6 October 1967, the Secretary of the Navy designated the academic post as the Charles H. Stockton Chair of International Law in honor of Rear Admiral Charles Stockton, President of the Naval War College (1891 and 1898-1900), who had been the US Navy's first uniformed expert in international law.

The Stockton Chair was filled by distinguished visiting professors from its establishment until 2014, when the Chairperson of the Stockton Center for International Law was designated as the Stockton Professor. At that time, the Naval War College established the position of Charles H. Stockton Distinguished Scholar-in-Residence, to be held by visiting scholars of the international academic distinction.

List of office-holders
 1953-1954 Hans Kelsen
 1954-1955 Leo Gross
 1955-1956 Brunson MacChesney
 1956-1957 Ralph G. Jones
 1957-1958 Vacant
 1958-1959 Roland J. Stanger
 1959-1960 Carl M. Franklin
 1960-1961 William T. Mallison, Jr.
 1961-1962 Neill H. Alford, Jr.
 1962-1963 Carl Q. Christol
 1963-1964 Gordon B. Baldwin
 1964-1965 Vacant
 1965-1966 James F. Hogg
 1966-1967 Dennis M. O'Connor
 1967-1968 John H. Spencer
 1968-1969 Richard B. Lillich
 1969-1970 Oliver J. Lissitzyn
 1970-1971 L. F. E. Goldie
 1971-1972 Howard S. Levie
 1972-1974 Alwyn V. Freeman
 1974-1975 William T. Mallison, Jr.
 1975-1977 Vacant
 1977-1979 Gordon Christenson
 1979-1980 Hamilton DeSaussure
 1980-1981 John F. Murphy
 1981-1982 Alfred P. Rubin
 1982-1983 Jon L. Jacobson
 1983-1984 George Bunn
 1984-1985 W. Hays Parks
 1985-1986 George Bunn
 1986-1989 Richard J. Grunawalt
 1989-1990 Alberto R. Coll
 1990-1991 John H. McNeill
 1991-1992 Horace B. Robertson, Jr.
 1992-1993 George K. Walker
 1993-1994 Richard J. Grunawalt
 1994-1995 Robert F. Turner
 1995-1996 Myron H. Nordquist
 1996-1998 Leslie C. Green
 1998-1999 Ruth Wedgwood
 1999-2000 Yoram Dinstein
 2000-2001 Ivan Shearer
 2001-2001 Nicholas Rostow
 2002-2003 Yoram Dinstein
 2003-2004 Wolff Heintschel von Heinegg
 2004-2005 Charles Garraway
 2005-2006 Jane Dalton
 2006-2007 Craig H. Allen
 2007-2008 Michael N Schmitt
 2008-2009 Richard J. Grunawalt
 2009-2010 Derek Jenks
 2010-2012 Ken Watkin
 2012-2013 Wolff Heintschel von Heinegg
 2014-2018 Michael N Schmitt
 2015-2016 Timothy McCormack (Stockton Distinguished Scholar-in-Residence)
 2018–present James Kraska
 2020–present Michael Schmitt (Stockton Distinguished Scholar-in-Residence)

References

 
Naval War College faculty
International law scholars
Professorships in law
1951 establishments in Rhode Island